Azzano d'Asti is a comune (municipality) in the Province of Asti in the Italian region Piedmont, located about  southeast of Turin and about  southeast of Asti.

Azzano d'Asti borders the following municipalities: Asti and Rocca d'Arazzo.

References

Cities and towns in Piedmont